Our Savior's Church is a parish church of the Church of Norway in Haugesund Municipality in Rogaland county, Norway. It is located in the centre of the town of Haugesund. It is the church for the  parish which is part of the Haugaland prosti (deanery) in the Diocese of Stavanger. The large, red brick church was built in a cruciform design with a Neo-gothic style in 1901 using designs by the architect Einar Halleland. The church seats about 850 people.

History
Historically, the people of this area attended church at the nearby Skåre Church. In 1854, Haugesund was established as a ladested. As the small town grew, the residents began to ask for their own church in the town centre. In 1885, a plot of land was purchased and then in 1890, the government gave approval for a church to be built on the site. An architectural competition was held and the winner was Einar Halleland in February 1899. The church was built in 1899–1901 with consecration on 6 March 1902.

Media gallery

See also
List of churches in Rogaland

References

Haugesund
Churches in Rogaland
Brick churches in Norway
Cruciform churches in Norway
20th-century Church of Norway church buildings
Churches completed in 1901
1901 establishments in Norway